The Minister for Pacific Peoples is a ministerial portfolio in the government of New Zealand with responsibility over the Ministry for Pacific Peoples. The role was established in 1984 as Minister of Pacific Island Affairs, prior to which, Pacific Island affairs had been within the purview of the Minister of Foreign Affairs. The position was renamed Minister for Pacific Peoples on 22 December 2015.

The current minister is Barbara Edmonds.

List of Ministers
The following ministers have held the office of Minister for Pacific Peoples.

Key

See also
Department of Island Territories

Notes

References

Pacific Peoples